Sjögren syndrome type B antigen (SS-B) also known as Lupus La protein is a protein that in humans is encoded by the SSB gene.

Function 

La is involved in diverse aspects of RNA metabolism, including binding and protecting 3-prime UUU (OH) elements of newly RNA polymerase III-transcribed RNA, processing 5-prime and 3-prime ends of pre-tRNA precursors, acting as an RNA chaperone, and binding viral RNAs associated with hepatitis C virus. La protein was originally defined by its reactivity with autoantibodies from patients with Sjögren's syndrome and systemic lupus erythematosus.

Interactions 

Sjögren syndrome antigen B has been shown to interact with nucleolin.

See also 
 La domain

References

Further reading